Gregorio "Gringo" Ballesteros Honasan II (born March 14, 1948), is a Filipino politician and a cashiered Philippine Army officer who led unsuccessful coups d'état against President Corazon Aquino. He played a key role in the 1986 EDSA Revolution that toppled President Ferdinand Marcos.

After 1986, he led a series of unsuccessful but violent coup attempts against the administration of Corazon Aquino. President Fidel Ramos granted him amnesty in 1992. He entered politics and became a senator from 1995 to 2004, and again from 2007 to 2019. He ran for vice president of the Philippines, being Jejomar Binay's running-mate in 2016, but both were respectively defeated by Leni Robredo and Rodrigo Duterte.

On November 22, 2018, President Duterte appointed then-Senator Honasan as Secretary of Department of Information and Communications Technology, which took effect after the latter's senatorial term, with Eliseo Rio serving as acting secretary.

Early life
Gregorio Honasan was born in Baguio to Colonel Romeo Gillego Honasan and Alicia "Alice" Masip Ballesteros, both from Sorsogon province. He has six siblings. Honasan spent his elementary days at San Beda College from Kindergarten to Grade 6. After which, he went to Taiwan and studied at the Dominican School, Taipei, Taiwan. He then returned to the Philippines and finished his high school at Don Bosco Technical College. He attained his Bachelor of Science degree at the Philippine Military Academy, where he received the title of "Class Baron", the academy's highest leadership award.

Military career
After graduating in 1971, he joined the Philippine Army's special forces, Scout Ranger Regiment and went into combat against separatist and communist insurgents in Luzon and Mindanao. He was wounded in action at battles in Lebak and Jolo. Making his way up through the armed forces, he became aide-de-camp to Defense Minister Juan Ponce Enrile in 1974, and later became the Defense Ministry's Chief of Security.

Concurrent with his position as security chief, he was a board member of the Northern Mindanao Development Bank and president of the Beatriz Marketing Company.

Political career

People Power

In 1986, Honasan and a cabal of colonels, backed by Enrile, tried to use popular unrest to overthrow the dictatorship of President Ferdinand Marcos. When the plot was uncovered, the conspirators sought refuge in the military headquarters and called on civilians, the media, and the Catholic Church for protection. Hundreds of thousands of people served as human shields to protect Honasan and his men from Marcos' forces, sparking the 1986 People Power Revolution that led to Marcos' fall from power and the installation of Corazon Aquino as president.

Coups d'état

Aquino awarded Honasan a Distinguished Conduct Star for the EDSA Revolution and the Presidential Government Medal in 1986. Under the new government, he was head of a special group in the defense ministry. Using his position, he was covertly involved in various coup attempts against Aquino. 

On August 28, 1987, fighting broke out in the streets and Honasan ordered his men to attack government installations, resulting in the deaths of dozens, including many civilians. The attack was put down by government forces, but Honasan was able to escape. He was later captured and imprisoned on a Navy ship in Manila Bay. He later escaped once again by convincing his guards to join his cause.

Senate

Philippine President Fidel Ramos, who was elected in 1992, granted amnesty to Honasan, who  utilized his rebel infamy to enter politics in 1995, becoming the second independent candidate in Philippine history to win a seat in the Senate after Magnolia Antonino. He was re-elected in 2001, filling the vacant seat left by Senator Teofisto Guingona Jr., who was appointed by President Gloria Macapagal Arroyo as Vice President. From April 30 to May 1, 2001, together with Juan Ponce Enrile, Miriam Defensor Santiago, Panfilo Lacson and Vicente Sotto III, he led the EDSA III protests in support of deposed President Joseph Estrada.  On May 1, 2001, the protesters stormed Malacañang Palace.

He left the Senate when his term expired in 2004. In the general election held in May 2007, he was again elected to the Senate. Running as an independent candidate, he polled some 11.6 million votes, finishing 10th out of 37 candidates for 12 Senate vacancies.  He took up his post on June 30. He was reelected during the 2013 elections, placing 12th with 13,211,424 votes, his fourth term.

In June 2015, Justice Undersecretary Jose Justiniano amended the complaint against Senator Honasan for his alleged part in the Pork Barrel Scam involving allegations of corrupt malversation of public funds.

During the 2016 Philippine general elections, Honasan was Jejomar Binay's running mate under the United Nationalist Alliance party. Honasan placed 6th in the vice presidential race, garnering only 788,881 or 1.92% of votes.

Information and Communications Technology Secretary 
On November 22, 2018, President Duterte appointed Honasan as secretary of Department of Information and Communications Technology. Acting Secretary Eliseo Rio Jr. held the position until the end of Honasan's Senate term. Honasan was sworn into the office on July 1, 2019 and confirmed by the Commission on Appointments on September 11, 2019.

In January 2020, the Department was flagged by the Commission on Audit of the Philippines for  worth of cash advances of confidential funds under Honasan. Undersecretary of Operations Eliseo Rio Jr. also questioned the cash advances as he resigned from his position. Secretary Honasan and Undersecretary Rio later issued a joint statement to state that the confidential expenses were "lawful and legitimate" and that "Undersecretary Rio’s resignation was due to personal reasons, and not due to any rift with the Secretary, nor to any anomaly in the Confidential Expense."

2022 Senate bid 

On October 8, 2021, Honasan filed his Certificate of Candidacy to run once again for senator in 2022, effectively ending his time as Secretary of Information and Communications Technology. His candidacy was endorsed by President Rodrigo Duterte, making him part of the PDP–Laban senatorial slate, although he was an independent. He was also named to the senatorial slate of tickets led by presidential aspirants Panfilo Lacson and Bongbong Marcos (under UniTeam Alliance), respectively. However, he lost his bid with 10,668,886 votes, ranking 18th out of the 12 seats up for election. He conceded from the race on May 11, 2022.

In popular culture
Portrayed by veteran comedian Chiquito in the 1988 comedy film Gorio Punasan, Rebel Driver. (Instead Honasan's name, comedy title of Gringo Honasan to replacing as Gorio Punasan in the film)
Parodied in the 1987 movie Kumander Gringa starring Roderick Paulate.
Portrayed by character actor Rez Cortez in the 1988 true to life drama TV film  A Dangerous Life.
Portrayed by action star Robin Padilla in the 1994 true to life action drama film Col. Billy Bibit, RAM.

References

External links
Official campaign site of Gregorio Honasan
Gringo Honasan, Election 2016 Data

1948 births
Living people
Bicolano politicians
Candidates in the 2016 Philippine vice-presidential election
Duterte administration cabinet members
Independent politicians in the Philippines
People from Baguio
People from Marikina
People of the People Power Revolution
Philippine Army personnel
Philippine Military Academy alumni
Philippine Military Academy Class of 1971
Recipients of the Distinguished Conduct Star
Reform the Armed Forces Movement
Secretaries of Information and Communications Technology of the Philippines
Senators of the 10th Congress of the Philippines
Senators of the 11th Congress of the Philippines
Senators of the 12th Congress of the Philippines
Senators of the 14th Congress of the Philippines
Senators of the 15th Congress of the Philippines
Senators of the 16th Congress of the Philippines
Senators of the 17th Congress of the Philippines
United Nationalist Alliance politicians